German submarine U-1406 was a Type XVIIB U-boat of Nazi Germany's Kriegsmarine during the Second World War. She was one of a small number of U-boats fitted with Hellmuth Walter's high test peroxide propulsion system, which offered a combination of air-independent propulsion and high submerged speeds.

U-1406 was laid down on 30 October 1943 at the Blohm & Voss, Hamburg, as yard number 256. She was launched on 2 January 1945 and commissioned under the command of Oberleutnant zur See Werner Klug on 8 February 1945.

Design
She was assessed at  submerged. She had one shaft and one propeller.

The submarine was fitted with two  torpedo tubes (All fitted at the bow) and four torpedoes. The boat had a complement of 19 men.

Service history
U-1406 did not undertake any war patrols and was instead assigned as a training boat at first to the 8th U-boat Flotilla, followed by the 5th U-boat Flotilla.

The U-1406 was scuttled on 7 May 1945 in Cuxhaven. The wreck was later raised and broken up.

References

Bibliography

External links
 

German Type XVII submarines
Ships built in Hamburg
1944 ships
U-boats commissioned in 1944
World War II submarines of Germany
Experimental submarines
U-boats scuttled in 1945
Maritime incidents in May 1945